This is a list of seasons completed by the Mississippi State Bulldogs football team. Representing Mississippi State University, the Bulldogs compete in the Southeastern Conference West Division in the NCAA Division I FBS. Since 1914, Mississippi State has played its home games out of 61,337-seat Davis Wade Stadium in Starkville, Mississippi. Initially known as the Mississippi A&M Aggies, the program began play in 1895 as an independent before joining the Southern Intercollegiate Athletic Association the following season. The school did not field a football program from 1897 to 1900. In 1921, Mississippi A&M joined the Southern Conference, where they competed for twelve seasons before joining the SEC where they currently reside.

The Bulldogs won their first and only SEC championship in 1941, and captured a division title in 1998. As of the end of the 2017 season, Mississippi State has played in 24 bowl games, compiling a 14–10 record. They have played in a bowl game in eleven consecutive seasons dating back to 2010. The team is currently led by head coach Zach Arnett.

Seasons

Notes

References

Mississippi State

Mississippi State Bulldogs football seasons